BSHS may be:

 Ballston Spa High School, Ballston Spa, New York
 Beerwah State High School, Beerwah, Queensland, Australia
 Big Sky High School, Missoula, Montana
 Bishop Shanahan High School, Downingtown, Pennsylvania
 Bishop Stang High School, Dartmouth, Massachusetts 
 Boiling Springs High School (disambiguation)
 Brisbane State High School, Australia
 The British Society for the History of Science
 Bryan Station High School, Lexington, Kentucky
 Busan Science High School, South Korea